Donald Breckenridge (1932 – November 30, 2005) was founder and president of Breckenridge Hotels Corporation. Over the course of 43 years, he oversaw the building of 43 hotels in 11 US states, including the Breckenridge Pavilion, now the Pavilion Hotel, in St. Louis, Missouri. 

He was a board member of more than 30 civic organizations, including the Variety Club, the local Muscular Dystrophy Association and the St. Louis Visitors and Convention Commission. 

He died at the age of 73 on 30 November 2005, one year after being diagnosed with lung cancer. He was survived by his wife of 35 years, Diane Breckenridge, their six children and thirteen grandchildren.

References

External links
Short obituary of Donald Breckenridge
News article on his death

1932 births
2005 deaths
American hoteliers
Businesspeople from St. Louis

20th-century American businesspeople
Deaths from lung cancer in Missouri